Texier's disease is a pseudosclerodermatous reaction that occurs after injection with vitamin K, a subcutaneous sclerosis with or without fasciitis that lasts several years.

See also 
 Vitamin K reactions
 Skin lesion
 List of cutaneous conditions

References

External links 

Drug eruptions